Crydamoure (a variation of the French phrase cri d'amour or "cry of love" in English) was a French house record label owned by Guy-Manuel de Homem-Christo, one former half of the duo Daft Punk, and Eric Chedeville.

Background
The label was founded in 1997, with their first single "Holiday on Ice / Santa Claus" being the first release by de Homem-Christo and his label co-owner Eric Chedeville (under the guise of Le Knight Club). Crydamoure was one of the first French house labels to incorporate band and guitar influences into its production. The label was left defunct in 2003, and shut down.

In 2015, Crydamoure was revived after Le Knight Club released a single named "The Fight", made for the Algerian film Gates of the Sun. Le Knight Club's involvement in the revival of the label is uncertain.

Legacy 
The launch of Crydamoure was a chance for de Homem-Christo to embark on a sound different from Daft Punk and also a chance to bring budding new producers such as Romain Séo (Raw Man) and Paul de Homem-Christo (Play Paul; brother of Guy-Manuel) into the limelight. In regards to, Crydamoure, Homem-Christo stated:

Discography

Compilation albums
CRYDA CD001 Waves - 2000
CRYDA CD002 Waves II - 2003

Singles
 CRYDA 001: Le Knight Club - Santa Claus / Holiday On Ice (12") - 1997
 CRYDA 002: Paul Johnson - White Winds / Santa Claus (Remix) (12") - 1998
 CRYDA 003: Le Knight Club - Troobadoor / Mirage (12") - 1998
 CRYDA 004: Le Knight Club vs. DJ Sneak - Intergalactik Disko / Intergalactik Disko (DJ Sneak Version) (12") - 1998
 CRYDA 005: Le Knight Club - Boogie Shell / Coco Girlz / Mosquito / Coral Twist (12") - 1999
 CRYDA 006: The Buffalo Bunch - Take It To The Street (T.I.T.T.S.) / Music Box (12") - 1999
 CRYDA 007: Le Knight Club - Hysteria / Hysteria II (12") - 1999
 CRYDA 008: Raw Man - Lovers / Number Seven / Number Seven (Le Knight Club Remix) (12") - 1999
 CRYDA 009: Deelat - United Tastes Of Deelat (Wet Indiez / G.M.F. / Wetness Anthem) (12") - 1999
 CRYDA 010: Play Paul - Spaced Out / Holy Ghostz (12") - 2000
 CRYDA 011: The Eternals - Wrath Of Zeus (Original Mix) / (Light Mix) / (Dub Mix) / (Zeusappella) (12") - 2000
 CRYDA 012: Sedat - The Turkish Avenger / Feel Inside (12") - 2000
 CRYDA 013: Le Knight Club - Gator / Chérie D'Amoure (12") - 2001
 CRYDA 014: Archigram - Mad Joe / In Flight (Raw Club Mix) / In Flight (12") - 2001
 CRYDA 015: Le Knight Club - Soul Bells / Palm Beat / Tropicall (12") - 2002
 CRYDA 016: Le Knight Club - Nymphae Song / Rhumba (12") - 2002
 CRYDA 017: Archigram - Carnaval / Carnaval (Bring Back The Rave! Mix) (12") - 2002
 CRYDA 018: Crydajam - "If You Give Me The Love I Want" by Rico & Ouk feat. James Perry & Jane / "Playground" by Rico, Mederic Nebinger & Guyman / "Loaded" by Play Paul & Rico (12") - 2002
 CRYDA 019: Archigram - Doggystyle (12", S/Sided) - 2003

Unreleased
 Le Knight Club vs. DJ Sneak - Think Love, Not Hate
 Le Knight Club - Sequence Emotion

See also
 Roulé
 List of record labels

References

External links
 

French record labels
Record labels established in 1997
House music record labels